Radio Olovo is a Bosnian local public radio station, broadcasting from Olovo, Bosnia and Herzegovina.

Radio Olovo was launched on 13 February 1998 by the municipal council of Olovo. This radio station broadcasts a variety of programs such as music, local news, talk shows and sport. Program is mainly produced in Bosnian language.

Estimated number of potential listeners of Radio Olovo is around 8.277.

See also 
List of radio stations in Bosnia and Herzegovina

Frequencies
The program is currently broadcast at one frequency:

 Olovo

References

External links 
 www.radio.olovo.ba
 Communications Regulatory Agency of Bosnia and Herzegovina

Olovo
Radio stations established in 1998